Helicinidae is a family of small tropical land snails which have an operculum. They are terrestrial operculate gastropod mollusks in the superfamily Helicinoidea.

These snails are not at all closely related to the air-breathing land snails, despite a superficial similarity of the shells.  The name "Helicinidae" immediately reminds most people of "Helicidae", the most popular group of land snails including e.g. Helix pomatia, but the important two letters "ni" only from the Latin diminutive of the latter name alluding to superficial similarities of otherwise completely different things.

Distribution
These snails are found in tropical and subtropical areas but they have an odd distribution: they are restricted to the Caribbean islands and some Indo-Pacific and Pacific islands, as well as the edge of the Asian and Australian continents. Some species are found in the southern United States, from Louisiana to Florida; others in Central and South America.

Taxonomy 
Helicinidae belongs to superfamily Helicinoidea according to the taxonomy of the Gastropoda by Bouchet & Rocroi, 2005).

This family consists of six following subfamilies (according to the taxonomy of the Gastropoda by Bouchet & Rocroi, 2005):
 Helicininae Férussac, 1822 - synonym: Olygyridae Gray, 1847; Bourcierinae Paetel, 1890
 Ceratodiscinae Pilsbry, 1927
 † Dimorphoptychiinae Wenz, 1938
 Hendersoniinae H. B. Baker, 1926
 Stoastomatinae C. B. Adams, 1849
 Vianinae H. B. Baker, 1922

Genera
Genera within the family Helicinidae include:

Subfamily Helicininae
 Alcadia Gray, 1840
 Aphanoconia A. J. Wagner, 1905
 Bourciera Pfeiffer, 1852 
 Ceochasma F. G. Thompson, 1968 
 Ceratopoma Möllendorff, 1893 
 Emoda Adams, 1856
 Glyptemoda Clench & Aguayo, 1950
 Helicina Lamarck, 1799 - type  genus of the family Helicinidae
 Hemipoma Wagner, 1905
 Kosmetopoma A. J. Wagner, 1905
 Negopenia Iredale, 1941
 Nesiocina Richling & Bouchet, 2013
 Ogasawarana Wagner, 1905
 Olygyra Say, 1818: synonym of Helicina Lamarck, 1799 (original rank)
 Orobophana Wagner, 1905
 Palaeohelicina A. J. Wagner, 1905
 Pecoviana Iredale, 1941
 Pleuropoma Moellendorff, 1893
 Schasicheila Shuttleworth, 1852
 Stoastomops Baker, 1924
 Sturanya Wagner, 1905
 Sulfurina Möllendorff, 1893

subfamily Ceratodiscinae
 Ceratodiscus 	Simpson & Henderson, 1901 - type  genus of the subfamily Ceratodiscinae

Subfamily † Dimorphoptychiinae
 † Dimorphoptychia Sandberger, 1871 - type  genus of the subfamily Dimorphoptychiinae

Subfamily Hendersoniinae
 Hendersonia A. J. Wagner, 1905 - type  genus of the subfamily Hendersoniinae
 Waldemaria Wagner, 1905

Subfamily Stoastomatinae
 Stoastoma C. B. Adams, 1849 - type  genus of the subfamily Stoastomatinae

Subfamily Vianinae
 Calidviana Baker, 1954
 Calybium Morelet, 1891
 Eutrochatella Fischer, 1885
 Geophorus Fischer, 1885
 Heudeia Crosse, 1885
 Lucidella Swainson, 1840 
 Pseudotrochatella Nevill, 1881
 Pyrgodomus Fischer & Crosse, 1893
 Viana H. Adams & A. Adams, 1856 - type  genus of the subfamily Vianinae

Subfamily ?
 Priotrochatella Fischer, 1893
 Semitrochatella Aguayo & Jaume, 1958
 Sturanyella Pilsbry & Cooke, 1934
 Troschelviana Baker, 1922
 Ustronia Kobelt, 1908

References

Further reading 
 Richling I. (2001). "New species of Helicinidae from Costa Rica (Gastropoda: Neritopsina)". Schriften zur Malakozoologie 17: 1-8. Cismar.
 Richling I. (2004). "Classification of the Helicinidae: Review of Morphological Characteristics Based on a Revision of the Costa Rican Species and Application to the Arrangement of the Central American Mainland Taxa (Mollusca: Gastropoda: Neritopsina)". Malacologica 45(2): 195-440.
 Richling I. (2004). "Coloration in Helicinidae (Mollusca: Gastropoda: Neritopsina)". Malacologia 46(1): 217-224.
 Richling I. (2005). "Biographical remarks on Dr. Antoni Józef Wagner and the collection of Helicinidae in the Museum and Institute of Zoology in Warszawa". Folia Malacologica 13(4): 197-206.
 Richling I. & Glaubrecht M. (2008). "The types of Neotropical Helicinidae (Mollusca, Gastropoda, Neritopsina) in the Malacological Collection of the Museum für Naturkunde Berlin: an annotated catalogue, with emphasis on Cuban land snails". Zoosystematics and Evolution 84(2): 265-310. .
 Richling I. (2009). "The Radiation of the Helicinidae in New Caledonia (Mollusca: Gastropoda: Neritopsina) including zoogeographical considerations". In: Grandcolas P. (ed.). "Zoologia Neocaledonica 7. Biodiversity studies in New Caledonia". Mémoires du Muséum national d'Histoire naturelle 198: 247-372. Paris. abstract

species specific reading:
 Richling I., Franke S., Fernánndez V. A. & Sigaretta V., S. (2007). "New data on the micro-land snails Eutrochatella (Microviana) spinopoma Aguayo 1943 and Eutrochatella (Microviana) holguinensis Aguayo 1932 (Neritopsina: Helicinidae) in the province of Holguín, eastern Cuba". Schriften zur Malakozoologie 23: 19-24. Cismar.

External links 
 
  Richling I. Forschung an Helicinidae
 The Land Snail Family Helicinidae
 The Costa Rican Helicinidae
 Newly introduced Taxa of Helicinidae by Ira Richling

 
Gastropod families